"An Easter Story" was the final episode of the first season of The Waltons. It was also the first two-hour show of the series.

Plot
Olivia begins to experience pain and fatigue, and eventually collapses after church.  Numbness in her legs turns to paralysis, and she is diagnosed with polio.  However, she refuses to believe that she will never walk again.

Jason is inspired by Grandma as she does her housework.  He composes a song he calls "The Ironing Board Blues" which he performs in an amateur talent contest. He wins the contest and a new guitar. The family watches him perform. Back at home, they reenact the contest for Olivia and Erin.

When John-Boy checks in to apply at the University of Virginia, he finds out there is a doctor who specializes in the treatment of polio.  John-Boy seeks the doctor out and he tells John-Boy of a new experimental treatment. John-Boy and Grandma encourage Olivia to try the exercises against the advice of the doctor, who suggests that the experimental treatment could leave her worse off. At first, she has hope of recovery by Easter, but then she becomes discouraged and resigns herself to life in a wheelchair. However, shortly before Easter, she dreams that Elizabeth calls out for help, and she gets up out of bed without effort.

Olivia attends the Easter sunrise service on the mountain with her family, celebrating the apparent miracle.

Cast
 Richard Thomas as John-Boy Walton
 Ralph Waite as John Walton, Sr.
 Michael Learned as Olivia Walton
 Ellen Corby as Ester Walton
 Will Geer as The Grandfather
 Judy Norton as Mary Ellen Walton
 Jon Walmsley as Jason Walton
 Mary Beth McDonough as Erin Walton
 Eric Scott as Ben Walton
 David W. Harper as Jim-Bob Walton
 Kami Cotler as Elizabeth Walton
 Joe Conley as Ike Godsey
 Earl Hamner Jr. as The Narrator
 Joseph Bernard as Snyder
 Joe Frank Carollo as Tom
 Don Collier as Dr. Miller
 John Crawford as Sheriff Ep Bridges
 David Doremus as George William "GW" Haines

Production

Writing
The episode was written by Earl Hamner, Jr. and John McGreevey.

Reception
In 2009, TV Guide ranked this episode #77 on its list of the 100 Greatest Episodes of All Time.

Awards

Notes

References

External links
 
 An Easter Story at All About the Waltons

The Waltons
1973 American television episodes